James Caldwell (April 1734 – November 24, 1781) was a Presbyterian minister who played a prominent part in the American Revolution.

Biography
Caldwell was born in Cub Creek in Charlotte County, Province of Virginia, the seventh son of John and Margaret Caldwell, who were Scots-Irish settlers, and traced their ancestry to Huguenots who fled France to Scotland in the 16th century, established Caldwell Castle and later defended the Ulster Plantation and Derry. James Caldwell graduated from the College of New Jersey (later called Princeton University) in 1759 and, although he inherited  in Cub Creek, chose to become pastor of the Presbyterian Church in Elizabethtown, New Jersey. He was an active partisan on the side of the Patriots, and was known as the "Fighting Parson".  His church and his house were burned by Loyalists in 1780. 

While Caldwell was stationed with the army in Morristown, his wife Hannah was killed by British gunfire under disputed circumstances during the Battle of Connecticut Farms in what is now Union Township, an act which Union County immortalizes on their county seal to this day. His wife had been at home with their baby and a 3 year old toddler. As the British moved into Connecticut Farms, Hannah Caldwell was shot through a window or wall as she sat with her children on a bed.

Caldwell, who fought in the Battle of Springfield, was killed on November 24, 1781, by an American sentry in Elizabethtown, New Jersey, when he refused to have a package inspected. The sentry, James Morgan, was hanged for murder on January 29, 1782 in Westfield, New Jersey, amid rumors that he had been bribed to kill the chaplain. Their nine orphaned children were raised by the family's friends.

Legacy
A monument to Caldwell in Elizabeth, New Jersey was dedicated in 1846.  
Three towns, known collectively as The Caldwells are named for James Caldwell: 
Caldwell, New Jersey
North Caldwell, New Jersey
West Caldwell, New Jersey
Schools
James Caldwell High School in West Caldwell 
 James Caldwell Elementary School in Springfield, New Jersey.
Hannah Caldwell Elementary School in Union, New Jersey, which carries his wife's name.
Caldwell University (formerly Caldwell College) located in Caldwell, NJ also carries his name.

References

For the date of the murder, see New Jersey Supreme Court, case number 37028, New Jersey State Archives, Trenton, NJ

External links
 Clan Currie biography of James Caldwell
 Chicago Scots club biography

1734 births
1781 deaths
American murder victims
American Revolutionary War deaths
Clergy in the American Revolution
People of New Jersey in the American Revolution
American Presbyterian ministers
Princeton University alumni
People murdered in New Jersey
American people of Scotch-Irish descent
People from Charlotte County, Virginia
People of colonial New Jersey
Virginia colonial people
1781 murders in the United States